A pawn storm is a chess tactic in which several pawns are moved in rapid succession toward the opponent's defenses.

Examples
A pawn storm will often be directed toward the opponent's king after it has castled toward one side (e.g. Fischer–Larsen, 1958). Successive advances of the pawns on that side might rapidly cramp and overwhelm the opponent's position.

A pawn storm might also be directed at queening a passed pawn; the diagram is taken from a game in which Tigran Petrosian was playing the black pieces against Bobby Fischer. Over the next fourteen moves, Petrosian storms his twin pawns down the a- and b- files, forcing Fischer's .

References

Chess strategy